Homer C. Martin was an American football player and coach. He played football for the West Virginia Mountaineers and is a member of their hall of fame.  Martin was the head football coach at the New River State School—now known as West Virginia University Institute of Technology—in Montgomery, West Virginia for four seasons, from 1923 until 1926, compiling a record of 15–19–6.

References

Year of birth missing
Year of death missing
American football fullbacks
Basketball coaches from West Virginia
Charleston Golden Eagles football coaches
Charleston Golden Eagles men's basketball coaches
College men's basketball head coaches in the United States
West Virginia Mountaineers football players
West Virginia Tech Golden Bears football coaches
Sportspeople from Charleston, West Virginia
Players of American football from West Virginia